Farbman is a surname. Notable people with the surname include:

Michael S. Farbman (c.1880-1933), Russian writer
Nat Farbman (1907–1988), American photographer
Phil Farbman (1924–1996), American basketball player
Rafail Farbman (1893–1966), Russian Jewish revolutionary and Bolshevik
Zeev Farbman (born 1979), Israeli entrepreneur